KL Metropolis is a 75.5-acre mixed development situated nearby the Kuala Lumpur Courts Complex in the district of Segambut, Kuala Lumpur, Malaysia. The term "KL" from its name is short for Kuala Lumpur. This RM21 billion development is envisioned to become the leading centre for international trade and exhibition of Kuala Lumpur, similar to the Tun Razak Exchange which on the other hand will become the city's new financial district. KL Metropolis will integrate trade, commerce, living, and transport in one bustling hub located within the big city which will be built in stages over a duration of 20 years.

A proposed direct link road from the NKVE and DUKE Highway connecting Jalan Sultan Haji Ahmad Shah junction has also been planned to ease traffic for the development in the future. An MRT3 station will also be built along Jalan Dutamas 2. 

KL Metropolis' landmark building will be the 100-storey NAZA Signature Tower within MET 3, and is set to dominate the skyline in the western side of Kuala Lumpur.

Developer 
The master developer of the KL Metropolis development is being undertaken by Naza TTDI Sdn Bhd, a subsidiary of the larger Naza Group.

Precincts 
The development is subdivided into nine parcels - MET 1, MET 2, MET 3, MET 5, MET 6, MET 7, MET 8, MET 9 as well as MITEC which was accordingly supposed to be the MET 4. Two of the precincts will be jointly developed with partners; MET 5 with Hap Seng Land Sdn Bhd while MET 8 with Triterra Metropolis Sdn Bhd.

Arte Mont Kiara 

Three towers comprising simplex, duplex suites and serviced residences on a  land. Arte Mont Kiara was developed by Arte Corp, formerly known as Nusmetro Property Sdn Bhd (Nusmetro), under a joint-venture with Naza TTDI. The project was launched in 2015 and completed in 2020.

MATRADE 

Housed the Malaysia External Trade Development Corporation headquarters and MATRADE Exhibition and Convention Centre (MECC).

MITI 
33-storey office tower with the Ministry of International Trade and Industry's main headquarters, commonly known as MITI Tower or Menara MITI, will be situated within the development.

Malaysia International Trade and Exhibition Centre 
13-acre land developed on top of MET 4 with a total area of 1.5 million square feet. The Malaysia International Trade and Exhibition Centre (MITEC) is the first flagship and component of the development which officially opened in August 2017.

Metropolis Park 
Also known as the KL Metropolis Park, it will have  of urban park and recreational facilities which will be constructed in between MET 3 and MITEC as part of the government's Greener KL initiative. It will be integrated to the other precincts via pedestrian walkaways in the district while Naza TTDI Sdn Bhd will be managing the RM20 million park over 15 years. Among the facilities included will be a dry and wet playground, jogging park, kinetic fitness stations, therapeutic garden, terrace garden, sculpture park, picnic mound, nightscapes, event lawn, amphitheatre and dry fountain. The park is slated for completion by 2023, though construction works have not commenced yet.

MET 1 – Somerset, Met Galleria, Met 1 Residences 
TTDI KL Metropolis Sdn Bhd, a wholly-owned subsidiary of Naza TTDI, is currently constructing MET 1 on 4.25 acres of land right beside the Kuala Lumpur High Court. MET 1’s development will include an office tower, 55-storey MET1 Residences, Somerset KL Metropolis by The Ascott Limited (Ascott) and MET Galleria. It is also one of the first retail component of the KL Metropolis development with  space on 3 levels of retail. The project was officially kicked off in 2017 and is expected to be completed in 2023.

MET 2 – TBA 
Consist of strata offices with a 4-star hotel.

MET 3 – Naza Signature Tower 
15.3-acre land for the proposed  lifestyle mall located at the foot of the NAZA Signature Tower. MET 3 will also be built together with a luxury condominium, 5-star hotel together with Grade A office towers. In January 2022, Hap Seng Consolidated Berhad had plans to acquire the land of MET 3 under a purchase agreement to strengthen its property development business particularly in KL Metropolis.

MET 5 – KL Midtown 
An  of land currently under construction and consist of a mixed-use development. Met 5 will include a retail mall, office towers, residential towers and a 5-star hotel under Hyatt Regency. MET 5 was launched in 2018. (Partnership with Hap Seng Land Sdn Bhd)

MET 6 – The Fiddlewoodz 
It has been slated for completion by 2025 with a gross development value of RM828 million. (Partnership with EXSIM Development Sdn Bhd)

MET 7 – TBA 
Proposed serviced residential towers with constructions expected to commence in 2023 after the completion of MET 1.

MET 8 – The MET Corporate Towers 

The MET Corporate Towers are currently under construction since 2018 and will feature two Grade A strata office towers, Tower A and Tower B respectively. (Partnership with Triterra Metropolis Sdn Bhd)

MET 9 – TBA 
A proposed 6-star luxury hotel next to MITEC.

Public transportation 
In the future, the district will be served by the proposed  Dutamas MRT station on the MRT Circle Line. The station is still in planning stage as the developer is working with the Malaysian government to identify a site for the station.

The nearest station to the area as for now is the  Segambut Komuter station of the  Port Klang Line.

See also 

List of tallest buildings in Malaysia
Malaysian National Projects
 Naza Group of Companies
Tun Razak Exchange (TRX)

References

External links 

 KL Metropolis official website
 Naza TTDI's website
 MITEC website
 MET Galleria retail mall
 Somerset KL Metropolis Kuala Lumpur
 Arte Mont Kiara by Arte Corp
 KL MidTown by Hap Seng Land
 The Fiddlewoodz by EXSIM Group
 The MET Corporate Towers by Triterra Metropolis Sdn Bhd 

Economy of Kuala Lumpur
Buildings and structures in Kuala Lumpur
Geography of Kuala Lumpur
Kuala Lumpur